The U18 Ontario Curling Championships (formerly the Ontario Bantam Curling Championships) is the provincial under-18 men's and women's curling championship for Southern Ontario.

When the event was known as the Ontario Bantam Championships, it was eligible for curlers 16 and under. The event became the U18 championships in 2017.

Winners - Men

Winners - Women

References

Past champions - men's
Past champions - women's

Curling in Ontario
Canadian U18 Curling Championships